Franklin Achinike Owhor (born 10 October 1958) is a Nigerian lawyer, politician and member of the Rivers State Peoples Democratic Party. He is an autochthon of the Ikwerre tribe in Obio-Akpor local government area. He served as the Deputy Mayor of Port Harcourt in 1988 and was the 13th Attorney General of Rivers State and  Commissioner for Justice from 1996 until 1999 and was reappointed for a second term shortly before the civilian fourth republic. Having served previously as The chairman of assess sharing rivers and Bayelsa, He also served two terms as a Federal Commissioner in the Revenue Mobilization Allocation and Fiscal Commission (RMAFC) from 2006 until 2016. He is the Secretary of Wike Transition Committee.
Among others he is also a member of the board of directors of Oil and gas free zone authority (Ogfza).

Early life and education

Owhor was born 10 October 1958 and was raised in Choba, Obio-Akpor, in the metropolis of Port Harcourt, the capital of Rivers State, Nigeria. He is an alumnus of Akpor Grammar School, where he rounded off his secondary education. 
He proceeded the University of Lagos, Nigeria in 1980 to for his tertiary education, from where he obtained his undergraduate degree in law (LL.B.) in 1983. He was called to the Nigeria bar in 1984.

See also
List of people from Rivers State

References

RMAFC: Tukur, 24 Others to Go May 12 After Tenure - Proshare
https://www.proshareng.com › newsn › R...
FRANK OWHOR & CO. (Port Harcourt, Nigeria) - Nigeria Business Directory
https://www.businesslist.com.ng › company
https://www.ogfza.gov.ng/index.php/2018/03/02/photo-news-inauguration-board-directors-ogfza/

1958 births
Living people
Rivers State Peoples Democratic Party politicians
Rivers State lawyers
Attorneys General of Rivers State
Ikwerre people
People from Obio-Akpor